The Rīgas 1. pilsētas teātris or Riga City Theater (German: Rigaer Stadttheater), was the first permanent theater in the city of Riga in Latvia, founded in 1782. It was the first permanent theater in Latvia and the Baltic. It hosted both theater as well as opera performances and concerts. It is the origin of the current Latvian national opera. It was a center of culture in the Baltic, and Richard Wagner (1837–39), Franz Liszt (1842), Clara Schumann (1844), Anton Rubinstein (1844) and Hector Berlioz (1847) where all employed there at some points in their careers.

References

 Dziļleja K. Rīga - teātru pilsēta. / Rīga kā Latvijas galvaspilsēta. - Rīgas pilsētas valdes izdevums: Rīga, 1932.

18th-century establishments in Latvia
Theatres completed in 1782
18th century in Latvia
History of Riga